John Zoltan Sumegi (born 27 October 1954) is a retired Australian flatwater canoeist. He competed in the 1976 and 1980 Olympics and won a silver medal in the K-1 500 m event in 1980. He won another silver medal in this event at the 1979 ICF Canoe Sprint World Championships.

References

Sports-reference.com profile

1954 births
Australian male canoeists
Canoeists at the 1976 Summer Olympics
Canoeists at the 1980 Summer Olympics
Living people
Olympic canoeists of Australia
Olympic silver medalists for Australia
Olympic medalists in canoeing
ICF Canoe Sprint World Championships medalists in kayak
Medalists at the 1980 Summer Olympics
People from Orange, New South Wales
Sportsmen from New South Wales
20th-century Australian people